{{Infobox election
| election_name   = 2018 Selangor state election
| country         = Selangor
| type            = legislative
| ongoing         = 
| previous_election = 2013 Selangor state election
| previous_year   = 2013
| previous_mps    = Malaysian State Assembly Representatives (2013-)#Selangor
| next_election   = 2023 Selangor state election
| next_year       = 2023
| next_mps        = 
| elected_mps     = Malaysian State Assembly Representatives (2018-)#Selangor
| seats_for_election = All 56 seats in the Selangor State Legislative Assembly 
| majority_seats  = 29
| registered      = 2,415,074
| turnout         = 2,074,891 (85.91%)
| election_date   = 9 May 2018
| image1          = Azmin MP Kepong (cropped).jpg
| image1_size     = 150px
| leader1         = Azmin Ali
| leader_since1   = 8 March 2008
| party1          = Pakatan Harapan (PKR)
| colour1         = E21118
| leaders_seat1   = Bukit Antarabangsa
| last_election1  = 29 seats, 44.00%  (Pakatan Rakyat)
| seats_before1   = 29
| seats_needed1   = | seats1          = 51| seat_change1    = 22
| popular_vote1   = 1,303,102| percentage1     = 63.37%| swing1          = 

| image2          =  BN
| image2_size     = 150px
| leader2         = Noh Omar
| leader_since2   = 25 April 1995
| party2          = Barisan Nasional (UMNO)
| colour2         = 000080 
| leaders_seat2   = Not contesting(MP of Tanjong Karang)
| last_election2  = 12 Seats, 38.96%
| seats_before2   = 11
| seats_needed2   =  18
| seats2          = 4
| seat_change2    = 7
| popular_vote2   = 450,742
| percentage2     = 21.92%
| swing2          =

| image3          =  GS
| image3_size     = 150px
| leader3         = Sallehen Mukhyi
| leader_since3   = 2004
| party3          = Gagasan Sejahtera (PAS)
| color3           = 009000
| leaders_seat3   = Sabak(lost seat)
| last_election3  = 15 seats, 15.38%  (Pakatan Rakyat)	
| seats_before3   = 13
| seats_needed3   =  16
| seats3          = 1
| seat_change3    = 12
| popular_vote3   = 296,250
| percentage3     = 14.41%
| swing3          = 
| map_image       = Selangor DUN map.svg
| map_size        = 
| map_caption     = Selangor state election results map
| title           = Menteri Besar Selangor
| posttitle       = Menteri Besar Selangor-designate
| before_election = Mohamed Azmin Ali
| before_party    = Pakatan Harapan , (PKR)
| after_election  = Mohamed Azmin Ali
| after_party     = Pakatan Harapan , (PKR)
}}

The 14th Selangor state election was held on 9 May 2018 to elect the State Assemblymen of the 14th Selangor State Legislative Assembly, the legislature of the Malaysian state of Selangor.

The Selangor State Legislative Assembly was dissolved in a simple ceremony on 9 April 2018 by Sharafuddin of Selangor. Alternatively, the legislative would automatically dissolve on 21 June 2018, the fifth anniversary of the first sitting, and elections must be held within sixty days (two months) of the dissolution (on or before 21 August 2018, with the date to be decided by the Election Commission of Malaysia), if it was not dissolved prior to that date by the Head of State, Sultan of Selangor on the advice of the Head of Government, Menteri Besar of Selangor.

The election was conducted by the Malaysian Election Commission and utilised the first-past-the-post system. Electoral candidates were nominated on 28 April. On 9 May, between 8.00 a.m. and 5.00 p.m. Malaysian time (UTC+8), polling was held in all 56 state constituencies throughout Selangor; each constituency elects a single State Assemblyman to the state legislature. The incumbent party Pakatan Harapan won a supermajority of 51 seats and was able to form a government, securing a third term. The opposition Barisan Nasional won 4 seats while Gagasan Sejahtera won 1 seat. Azmin Ali returned as the Menteri Besar of Selangor before releasing his position a little over a month later to take the position in the Cabinet of Malaysia as the Minister of Economic Affairs. Amirudin Shari succeeded him as the 16th Menteri Besar of Selangor and was sworn in on 19 June 2018.

Background
The state election is the 14th state election in Selangor since the independence of Malaya (now Malaysia) in 1957. The governing Pakatan Harapan (PH) will seek to secure their third consecutive term in office since 2008.
According to the Laws of the Constitution of Selangor 1959, the maximum term of the Selangor State Legislative Assembly, the legislature of Selangor, is five years from the date of the first sitting of Assembly following a state election, after which it is dissolved by operation of law. The Assembly would have been automatically dissolved on 21 June 2018, the fifth anniversary of its first sitting on 21 June 2013.

Electoral system
Each state constituencies of Selangor will elect one member to the Selangor State Legislative Assembly using the first-past-the-post voting system. If one party obtains a majority of seats, then that party is entitled to form the State Government, with its leader as Menteri Besar. If the election results in no single party having a majority, there is a hung assembly, of which will be dissolved under the royal prerogative of the Sultan.

The redistricting of electoral boundaries for the entire country had been presented to and passed by the Dewan Rakyat, and subsequently gazetted on 29 March 2018 after obtaining the royal consent of the Yang di-Pertuan Agong ahead of the 14th general election. Elections are conducted by the Election Commission of Malaysia (EC), which is under the jurisdiction of the Prime Minister's Department.

Voting Eligibility

To vote in the state election, one had to be:
 registered in the electoral roll as an elector in the constituency in which he resides on;
 aged 21 or over on the registration date;
 a resident of the constituency, or if not so, an absentee voter;
 not disqualified under any law relating to offences committed in connection with elections.

Electoral divisions
All 56 constituencies within Selangor, which constitute the Selangor State Legislative Assembly, were contested during the election.
 

Timeline
The key dates are listed below in Malaysia Standard Time (GMT+8):

Contenders
The incumbent party, Pakatan Harapan have decided to contest all 56 seats in Selangor. Malaysian United Indigenous Party (Bersatu) expressed their desire to contest in the 12 seats won by the Barisan Nasional in the last general election. National Trust Party (Amanah) will target to contest in 15 seats held by Pan-Malaysian Islamic Party (PAS) in the last general election. Pakatan Harapan will finalize the remaining 21 seats before 23 February 2018. On 8 March 2018, Pakatan Harapan has successfully finalized 50 seats. Pakatan Harapan has yet to finalize 6 seats. The seats are Sungai Panjang, Sungai Burong, Lembah Jaya, Dusun Tua, Seri Serdang and Kota Damansara.

The opposition Barisan Nasional (BN) is also set to contest all 56 seats in Selangor State Legislative Assembly. Barisan Nasional (BN) linchpin party United Malays National Organisation (UMNO) is to set to contest major share of Barisan Nasional (BN) seats. Gagasan Sejahtera also states that they will contest all 56 seats in Selangor. Pan-Malaysian Islamic Party (PAS) will compete for 42 seats, while Parti Sosialis Malaysia (PSM) will contest 5 seats in Semenyih, Bukit Lanjan, Kota Damansara, Pelabuhan Klang and Sri Muda.

 Political parties 

Manifestos
Several parties launched specific manifestos for Selangor ahead of the state election.

Barisan Nasional
Barisan Nasional launches their manifestos on 8 April 2018. Using the theme, Better Selangor. Yakinlah. BN lebih baik! (English: Better Selangor. Rest assured. BN is better!), the manifestos consist of 10 programs, containing 100 initiatives focusing on the betterment of Selangorians.

Gagasan Sejahtera
Gagasan Sejahtera launches their manifestos on 29 March 2018. They use the theme Selangor Sejahtera (English: Prosperous Selangor) in their manifestos. It consist of 10 cores focusing on forming a government and administration that follows the principles of divinity, accountability and competent in making a peaceful environment for the multiracial and multi-religion state.

Parti Rakyat Malaysia
Parti Rakyat Malaysia publishes their manifesto on their blog on 30 April 2018.Manifesto' Peace and harmony
 Reduce reliance on foreign workers
 Reinstate local government election involving the participation of local candidates
 Economic opportunities
 Environment
 Affordable Housing
 Participation in Improving Security and a Better Community
 Improve Competitiveness Among Young People
 Encouraging Youth Involvement in Agriculture and Agribusiness
 Formulate Comprehensive Labour Policy To Ensure Private Sectors Employ Permanent Staff Instead Of Contract Staff

People's Alternative Party
People's Alternative Party only has two candidates competing in Selangor. One of the candidates, the Selangor branch chairman Harry Arul Krishnan, states that he will resolve the issue of birth certificate and identity cards for the stateless and launch crime intervention programs among other thing during his manifesto announcement on 3 May 2018 in Sungai Pelek.

Independent Candidates
Some of the independent candidates releases their own manifesto, specific for their contested seat.

Azman Mohd Noor
Azman contested at Rawang seat. His manifesto includes:

Support the economy, spiritual and the people's welfare development program
Continuing the organized and systematic care of infrastructures in Rawang
Upgrading the places of worship 
Healthy lifestyle
Helps to restructure small businesses
Free tuition
Hygiene campaigns
Recycling campaigns
Upgrading the existing health centers

Azwan Ali
Azwan Ali, contested against his elder brother, former Menteri Besar of Selangor, Azmin Ali at Bukit Antarabangsa seat. He announces his manifesto on 27 April 2018, pledging to:

Meet the people every day to listen to their problems
Eliminate the corruption culture in politics immediately
Solve the water supply problems in Selangor
Provide affordable housing for the people
Give charity to the people

Toh Sin Wah
Toh Sin Wah contested at Subang Jaya seat. He didn't announce specific manifesto but regards his participation in the election as "to bring politics to the people", going against the exclusive and nepotistic politics concept brought by the two biggest parties, Barisan Nasional and Pakatan Harapan.

Nomination

Candidates were nominated at numerous nomination centres around Selangor on 28 April. The candidates must deliver their nomination papers by 10 am to qualify to contest in the election.

Nomination centres

The contested seats and candidates

Campaign
In April 2018, the Selangor Islamic Council (MAIS) and Selangor Islamic Department (JAIS) released circulars following the decree by Sharafuddin of Selangor, to remind the public about the prohibition of using mosques as campaigning sites for the election.

The electoral campaign in the northernmost parliament seat Sabak Bernam, which included the assembly seat Sungai Air Tawar and Sabak targeted on issues faced by the locals, who are mostly farmers and fishermen. In Sungai Air Tawar, BN candidate Rizam Ismail planned to build up the town and helping small scale entrepreneurs by upgrading broken stalls and give them exposure to online business. Sallehen Mukhyi, the Sabak incumbent assemblyman and GS candidate, proposed for Sabak to be an agropolitan town to help farmers marketing their produce. Another candidate, Sallehuddin Iskan from BN used the slogan Berilmu, Berbakti, Berintegriti'' (in English: Knowledgeable, devoted and has strong moral principle) in his campaign, and pledge to help the local in issues regarding affordable housing and small scale palm oil farmers. Meanwhile, Ahmad Mustain of PH campaigned for Sabak to have modern agriculture practices that gives higher yields, higher wages and to reduce urban migration.

Jamal Yunos, the Sungai Besar UMNO division chief, organised a consert and offered a cash prize amounted to RM25,000 to a lucky draw winner in return for votes for Barisan Nasional candidates. He also launched a campaign to stick BN stickers to vehicles in exchange of RM10 each. Sekinchan DAP lodges a police report on the incident, claiming it went against the election rules. Sekinchan voters, when interviewed expressed different voting preferences, some voted based on the candidates and some voted based on which party the candidates endorsed.

Selangor branch of the Royal Malaysia Police stated that 114 reports were lodged throughout the ten days of campaigning duration.

Election pendulum 

The 14th General Election witnessed 51 governmental seats and 5 non-governmental seats filled the Selangor State Legislative Assembly. The government side has 21 safe seats and 8 fairly safe seats. However, none of the non-government side has safe and fairly safe seat.

Results

After all 56 constituencies had been declared, the results were:

The result of the election was announced after 5pm on 9 May 2018. Pakatan Harapan won 51 out of 56 seats and was entitled to form a government in Selangor.

The Pakatan Harapan (PH) coalition won its best ever electoral results in Selangor and retained their control of the state. In the previous election, its predecessor informal coalition Pakatan Rakyat only managed to snatch 29 seats to form a simple majority. This time around, they manage to secure 51 out of 56 seats and 63.37% of popular votes, of which PH state leader Azmin Ali had described as 'exceptional result, exceed my own expectations of 40 seats.' People's Justice Party (PKR) and Democratic Action Party (DAP), two of the parties in the coalition won in every seats they were contesting at. The debut of new parties, Malaysian United Indigenous Party (PPBM) and National Trust Party (AMANAH) had gone exceptionally well as they won 6 and 8 seats respectively, out of 9 and 10 seats they are competing.

The election also saw bad performance on Barisan Nasional (BN) coalition side. Not only the component parties Malaysian Indian Congress (MIC), Malaysian Chinese Association (MCA) and Malaysian People's Movement Party were unable to snatch any seat in the election but United Malays National Organisation (UMNO) only managed to retained four out of their eight seats won in the previous election. Gagasan Sejahtera lost most seat to PH in the election and was only able to retained one seat, Sijangkang.

The incumbent Menteri Besar of Selangor, Azmin Ali had defended his Bukit Antarabangsa seat with over 79% popular vote and overwhelming 25,512 majority votes. While GS Selangor leader, Salehen Mukhyi loses his seat in Sabak to AMANAH's Ahmad Mustain Othman with slim margin of 130 votes.

By constituency

Seats that changed allegiance

Aftermath
As the results were announced in the evening of 9 May, it is recognised that Pakatan Harapan had won a super majority in Selangor state, securing the third term for the coalition the govern the state.
 
Azmin Ali, as the leader of Pakatan Harapan of Selangor, had seek audience with Sultan Sharafuddin Idris Shah on the morning of 10 May to informed the Sultan of the result. In the meeting, Azmin also informed the Sultan that Pakatan Harapan of Selangor had announced their support for him to be the returning Menteri Besar. Sultan Sharafuddin is satisfied with the explanation and elected Azmin as the Menteri Besar of Selangor. He was sworn in on the morning of 11 May in front of the Sultan, Tengku Permaisuri Norashikin and members of Selangor Council of the Royal Court at Balairung Seri, Istana Alam Shah. On 13 May, Azmin submitted a list of candidates of Selangor State Executive Council to the Sultan to be considered. The ruler of the state is satisfied with the candidates and they were sworn in at Istana Alam Shah on the next day. In the same ceremony, Sultan Sharafuddin delivered his first address after the general election. He expressed his disappointment over the fractions among the Malays during the election campaign and encouraged the people to reunite once again. The Sultan also reminded the elected state representatives to serve the people well and not to involve themselves with corruption.

However, the then Menteri Besar's name was announced as one of the ministers of the newly formed federal government on 18 May 2018. He was named to head the newly established Ministry of Economic Affairs. He was reportedly surprised by the nomination and had only known of it from Selangor State Secretary, Mohd. Amin Ahmad Ahya. He then arranges a meeting with the Prime Minister, Mahathir Mohamad to discuss his role in the government. Azmin seek audience again with the Sultan of Selangor to discuss the situation since he didn't want to hold the post Menteri Besar and Minister of Economic Affairs at the same time. Selangor Royal Office then released a statement saying that the Sultan had given permission for Azmin to join the federal government and that he will held the Menteri Besar post for the time being while the Sultan consider several candidates to replace him.

On 30 May, Selangor Royal Office released a statement announcing that the swearing in ceremony of the new Menteri Besar will be held on 19 June, after Eid-ul Fitr and Azmin Ali will released his position on the same day. Amirudin Shari, the seat holder of Sungai Tua state constituency and a member of Selangor State Executive Council was appointed as the new Selangor Menteri Besar by the Sultan. His swearing in ceremony was held at Istana Alam Shah on 19 June per scheduled.

See also
Elections in Selangor
List of Malaysian State Assembly Representatives (2018-)#Selangor
Selangor State Legislative Assembly
Selangor State Executive Council
2018 Malaysian state elections
2018 Malaysian general election
Snap election
Recall election

References

Selangor state elections
Selangor
Selangor